Andrew Craig (born 16 March 1976) is a Scottish former professional rugby footballer who played both rugby league and rugby union at international level.

Rugby league
Craig previously represented Scotland at rugby league, playing for Wigan, Halifax, Widnes, and Swinton.

Rugby union
He switched to rugby union joining Orrell in 2000, before moving to Glasgow in the summer of 2004. He then moved to Leeds Tykes for the 2005/2006 season. He played as an outside centre.

Craig earned his first cap for Scotland on Saturday, 15 June 2002 against Canada in Vancouver, in 26-23 defeat.  Later that year, he became one of only 15 Scotland players to have scored a hat-trick after his three tries against Fiji.

Craig was an important member of the Scotland team for the 2003 Six Nations Championship. He played only a handful of games in the 2004 season. His luck changed again in 2005, when under the reign of the Matt Williams he was the starting outside centre. Although it was a disappointing season for Scotland (one win against Italy), Craig scored two tries, first against Wales, and then against England.

Craig suffered a setback after picking up an injury during the 2005/6 season for Glasgow. He returned to action for a few games after his injury and subsequently scored a try in one  of his games. Craig, however, had not been considered by Frank Hadden for the Scotland team for the Autumn Internationals and the 2006 Six Nations Championship.

2006 season
Craig decided to move from full-time rugby to semi-professional rugby. Lured by the prospect of managing a plumbing career whilst playing rugby, Craig decided to join Sedgley Park.

Retirement

Craig now runs a full-time plumbing and heating contraction company based in Warrington.

Notes

External links 
(archived by web.archive.org) Glasgow Profile
Statistics at rugbyleagueproject.org

1976 births
Living people
Dual-code rugby internationals
English people of Scottish descent
Glasgow Warriors players
Halifax R.L.F.C. players
Leeds Tykes players
Orrell R.U.F.C. players
Rugby articles needing expert attention
Rugby league centres
Rugby league players from St Helens, Merseyside
Scotland international rugby union players
Scotland national rugby league team players
Sedgley Park R.U.F.C. players
Swinton Lions players
Widnes Vikings players
Wigan Warriors players